Manuel Valleramos is a former Filipino tennis player.

Valleramos, the most successful out of three tennis playing brothers from Davao, was the Southeast Asian Games singles gold medalist in 1983. He was a member of the Philippines' 1978, 1982 and 1983 Davis Cup campaigns.

References

External links
 
 
 

Year of birth missing (living people)
Living people
Filipino male tennis players
Sportspeople from Davao City
Southeast Asian Games medalists in tennis
Southeast Asian Games gold medalists for the Philippines
Southeast Asian Games silver medalists for the Philippines
Southeast Asian Games bronze medalists for the Philippines
Competitors at the 1979 Southeast Asian Games
Competitors at the 1981 Southeast Asian Games
Competitors at the 1983 Southeast Asian Games
20th-century Filipino people